The Macropogones (literally "longbeards") were an ancient people who lived in Abkhazia (and as such likely spoke a Northwest Caucasian language).  Their name in Greek means "Big Beards" or "Long Beards".  This is a sobriquet and the name they called themselves was likely different.

See also

References 
 
Ancient peoples
Abkhazia